Wasim Feroz (born 1966) is a Pakistani field hockey player. He won a silver medal at the 1990 Hockey World Cupat Lahore and a bronze medal at the 1992 Summer Olympics in Barcelona.

At the end of 1994, the 1994 World Cup was held in Sydney. The Pakistanis finished first in their preliminary group, ahead of the Australians, and reached the final by beating the Germans 5–3 on penalties. There they defeated the Dutch team 4:3 in penalty shootout.

References

External links
 

1966 births
Living people
Pakistani male field hockey players
Olympic field hockey players of Pakistan
Field hockey players at the 1992 Summer Olympics
Olympic bronze medalists for Pakistan
Olympic medalists in field hockey
Medalists at the 1992 Summer Olympics
Field hockey players at the 1986 Asian Games
Field hockey players at the 1990 Asian Games
Asian Games medalists in field hockey
Asian Games gold medalists for Pakistan
Asian Games silver medalists for Pakistan
Medalists at the 1986 Asian Games
Medalists at the 1990 Asian Games
20th-century Pakistani people